Stonehill College is a private Roman Catholic liberal arts college in Easton, Massachusetts. It was founded in 1948 by the Congregation of Holy Cross and is located on the original estate of Frederick Lothrop Ames Jr., with 29 buildings that complement the original Georgian-style Ames mansion.

Stonehill's engineering majors spend their last four semesters of undergraduate education at the University of Notre Dame, Stonehill's sister institution and another Holy Cross school.

History 
In the autumn of 1934, the Holy Cross Fathers in North Dartmouth began to look for new quarters because of increasing seminary enrollment. The current Stonehill campus was purchased from Mrs. Frederick Lothrop Ames Jr. on October 17, 1935. The initial purchase included  and the original Ames mansion; the congregation purchased the remaining  from Mrs. Cutler two years later. Frederick Lothrop Ames Jr. was the great-grandson of Oliver Ames Sr., who came to Easton in 1803 and established the Ames Shovel Company.

The Commonwealth of Massachusetts authorized the Congregation of Holy Cross to establish Stonehill College on the Frederick Lothrop Ames Jr. estate on June 30, 1948. In September of that year the college enrolled 134 men as the first class. Classes were held in the mansion and in the Ames Gym.

The first building built by the college was the Science Building which opened in February 1949.  In 1974 the building was renovated and renamed the Tracy Science Building in honor of David Tracy, a former Stonehill advisor and trustee. After the opening of the Shields Science Center in 2009, the building was converted to be used by university administration and was renamed Merkert-Tracy Hall.

In June 2017 the college announced that W.B. Mason would be donating $10 million to open the Leo J. Meehan School of Business. The school is named after alumnus and W.B. Mason CEO Leo Meehan, and accommodates programs in accounting, finance, international business, management, marketing, economics, and healthcare administration.

The first issue of the college newspaper, The Summit, was published on November 3, 1949.  In the fall of 1951 the college decided to become a coeducational organization and enrolled 19 women. The first class graduated from Stonehill on the first Sunday of June 1952 and consisted of 73 men.

Academics
Through the May School of Arts and Sciences and the Meehan School of Business, Stonehill awards on the undergraduate level the B.A., B.S., and BSBA They have also added several master's degree programs. The Integrated Marketing Communications master's program was launched during the 2017–2018 school year, a Special Education (K-8) program was launched in May 2019, and a Data Analytics program launched in fall of 2020.

Stonehill offers 47 major programs, the opportunity to double major or participate in one of the college's 51 minor programs. Stonehill College is accredited by the New England Commission of Higher Education.

The MacPhaidin Library
The MacPhaidin Library, named in honor of Stonehill College's eighth president, Father Bartley MacPhaidin, C.S.C., was constructed in 1997 and opened in May 1998, at the college in North Easton, Massachusetts. The MacPhaidin Library is three stories high and covers 600,000 square feet. It houses a collection of 250,000 print volumes, including more than 100 full-text databases and indexes, and two computer labs. Various works of local art and history are on display at the library as well as a large collection of historical Irish documents and literature.

Student life

Campus media
 The Summit: Bi-weekly newspaper (student-run).
 Rolling Stonehill: Culture magazine (student-run).
 WSHL-FM: Radio station (student-run).
 Channel 70: Stonehill's TV station.

Housing
Stonehill provides guaranteed 4 years of housing to students admitted as residential students. The housing is set up as freshman/sophomore and junior/senior. O'Hara Hall and The Holy Cross Center are designated freshman traditional-style dorms.

Both freshmen and sophomores have the chance to live in Boland Hall, Corr Hall, and Villa Theresa Hall.

The Pilgrim Heights, the O'Hara Village and the Pilgrim Heights Village suite-style housing is primarily for sophomores.

Juniors and seniors all live in suite-style housing in the Colonial ("Junior") Courts, Commonwealth ("Senior") Courts, Pilgrim Heights (sophomores & juniors), Notre Dame du Lac, and New Hall.

Athletics

The Athletic Department fields 21 competitive NCAA Division I intercollegiate varsity sports. The College's combination of academic and athletic success has garnered Stonehill the #4 ranking in the country among NCAA Division II schools in the Collegiate Power Rankings that are published by the National College Scouting Association. Furthermore, Stonehill finished 65th in the overall NCSA Top 100 Power Rankings across all three NCAA divisions.

On April 5, 2022, Stonehill announced a transition to Div. I sports, with most of the teams joining the Northeast Conference, and men's ice hockey becoming a Div I independent for the 2022–2023 season.

The Sally Blair Ames Sports Complex is home to the college staff that sponsors fourteen intercollegiate club teams featuring Ultimate Frisbee, Rugby, Lacrosse and Golf as well as an extensive intramural sports program offering Basketball, Soccer, Floor Hockey and Flag Football.

W.B. Mason Stadium is a 2,400-seat, multipurpose sports stadium. Opened in 2005 at a cost of $4 million, it is the home of Skyhawk football, lacrosse, field hockey, and track & field. W.B. Mason, an office-supplies dealer based in nearby Brockton, Massachusetts, and its alumni employees contributed $1.5 million toward the project.

Notable alumni

Politics and government
 Marjorie Clapprood, member of the Massachusetts House of Representatives from 1985 to 1991
 Daniel F. Conley, Suffolk County District Attorney
 Claire D. Cronin, 25th United States Ambassador to Ireland
 David Finnegan, American attorney, talk show host, and politician
 Thomas P. Kennedy, former State Senator and State Representative in the Massachusetts Legislature
 Christopher Markey, member of the Massachusetts House of Representatives for the 9th Bristol district
 Christy Mihos, Massachusetts businessman and politician
 Stephen J. Murphy, former Boston city councillor, Suffolk County Register of Deeds
 Michael Novak, philosopher, journalist, diplomat, and former US Ambassador to the UN Commission on Human Rights
 David Simas, CEO of the Obama Foundation

Business
 Michael DeSisto, founder of The DeSisto School
 Keith Gill, security analyst
 Judith A. Salerno, former president and CEO of Susan G. Komen for the Cure
 Scott Thompson, former CEO of Yahoo, former President of PayPal

Journalism and art
 Ryan Asselta, television sportscaster, Comcast Sports New England & Fox 5 in New York City
 Duke Castiglione, former ESPN SportsCenter host, current sports journalist for WNYW Fox 5 in New York City
 Patrick McKay, screenwriter and showrunner of The Lord of the Rings: The Rings of Power
 Donna Denizé, American poet and award-winning teacher at St. Albans School
 Garth Donovan, independent filmmaker
 Dick Flavin, poet laureate of the Boston Red Sox
 Doug McIntyre, radio talk host, television writer and documentary film maker
 Gerard O'Neill, investigative reporter and editor for The Boston Globe
 Butch Stearns, radio sportscaster WEEI-FM

Military
 William P. Driscoll, decorated U.S. Navy flight officer, one of four American flying aces in the Vietnam War

Athletics
 Ed Cooley, Providence College men's basketball coach
 James "Lou" Gorman, General Manager for the Boston Red Sox (1984–1993)
 Andrew Jamiel, former wide receiver for the Stonehill Skyhawks football team (2016-2019), then for the Orlando Guardians of the XFL

References

External links
 
 Stonehill athletics website

 
Universities and colleges in Bristol County, Massachusetts
Educational institutions established in 1948
Holy Cross universities and colleges
Saint Edward's University
1948 establishments in Massachusetts